Tirumalairayanpattinam railway station is a railway station in Tirumalairayanpattinam, Karaikal district, Puducherry, India.

Jurisdiction
It belongs to the Tiruchirappalli railway division of the Southern Railway zone in Karaikal district in Puducherry. The station code is TMPT.

About
This is only passenger station falls between – broad-gauge section, which was opened for service on 19 June 2015.

Notable places nearby
 Aayiram Kaali Amman Temple

References

External links

Trichy railway division
Railway stations in Karaikal district
Railway stations in India opened in 2015